

News programs
La Voz de la Revolución (1958)
Tertulia (1962)
Primer Plano (1976–1986; 1987–1994; 1995; 1996; 1997-????; 200?-2004; 2006)
Lo de Hoy es Noticia (1983-199?)
Dicen y Hacen (1998)
El Observador Junior (1999–2001)

Drama/soap opera
Kaleidoscopio (1953–1957)
Anecdotario (1953–1954)
Teatro del Lunes (1954–1956)
Gran Teatro (1954–1955)
Ciclorama (1954)
Cuentos del Camino (1954–1955)
Candilejas (1954–1955)
Camay (1954)
Palmolive (1956)
La Única (1957)
La Novela LM (1957)
Mi Hermano Satans (1957)
Detrás del Telón (1957)
Tinieblas en el Corazón (1958)
Luz y Sombras (1958)
El Primer Milagro (1958)
El País Perdido (1958)
El Castillo de Hierro (1959)
Su Mala Hora (1959)
Ante la Ley (1960)
El Precio de Una Vida (1961–1963)
La Novela del Hogar (1964)
La Novela de Pasion (1964)
La Novela Romantica (1964)
El Derecho de Nacer (1965) (based on the Mexican version)
La Tirana (1964)
Historia de Tres Hermanas (1964)
Yo Compro a Esa mujer (1965)
Amor sin Fronteras (1965) (original version aired on Venevision) (1992)
Chinita, mi amor (1965)
Cimarrón (1966)
Clemencia (1966)
Cuando el Cielo es Más Azul (1966)
El Alma no tiene Color (1966)
El Engaño (1967)
La Cruz de Palo (1967)
La historia de un Canalla (1967)
La Indomable (1967, last aired in 1975)
La Italianita (1967–1968)
La Posada Maldita (1968)
Los Ojos que Vigilan (1968)
Mama Trompeta (1968)
Mariana Montiel (1969)
Mi Secreto me Condena (1969)
Selva, la Virgen de Barro (1969)
Tormenta de Pasión (1969)
Un Pedazo de Cielo (1970)
Doña Bárbara (1975)
Estefania (1979)
Raquel (1979)
La Hija de Juana Crespo (1977)
La Señora de Cárdenas (1977)
La Fiera (1978)
Abandonada (1978)
Alejandra (1971)
Boves, El Urogallo (1971)
Campeones (1971)
Carolina (1976)
Canaima (1972)
Cristina (1972)
El Hombre de la Máscara de Hierro (1972)
La Comadre (1979)
La Balandra Isabel Llegó esta Tarde (1979)
La Indomable (1975)
La Trepadora (1975)
Mabel Valdez (1975)
Mariela, Mariela (1975)
O.K. (1977)
Piel de Sapa (1978)
Pobre Negro (1978)
Sabrina (1976)
Sacrificio de Mujer (1977)
Silvia Rivas, divorciada (1977)
Sobre la Misma Tierra (1971)
Soltera y sin Compromiso (1978)
Sonia (1976)
Tormento (1977)
Tuya Para Siempre (1974)
TV Confidencial (1977)
Valentina (1979)
Elizabeth (1980)
Muñequita (1980)
Natalia de 8 a 9 (1980)
Mi Hijo Gabriel (1980)
Gómez I (1980)
Gómez II (1981)
Marielena (1981)
Luz Marina (1981)
Luisana Mia (1981)
El Esposo de Anaís (1981)
Angelito (1981)
La Señorita Perdomo (1982)
Qué pasó con Jacqueline? (1982)
Kapricho S.A. (1982)
La Goajirita (1982)
Claudia (1982)
Leonela (1983)
Chao Cristina (1983)
Marta y Javier (1983)
Bienvenida Esperanza (1983)
Ciclo de Oro de Rómulo Gallegos (1984)
La Salvaje (1984)
Marisela (1984)
Topacio (1984)
Azucena (1984)
Rebeca (1985)
Adriana (1985)
Cristal (1985–1986)
Atrévete (1986)
La Dama de Rosa (1986)
La Pasion de Teresa (1987)
La Intrusa (1987)
Primavera (1988)
Señora (1988)
Alma Mia (1988)
Abigail (1988)
Rubi Rebelde (1989)
Pobre Negro (1989)
El Engaño (1989)
Amanda Sabater (1989)
Alondra (1989)
De Mujeres (1990)
Carmen Querida (1990)
Anabel (1990)
Gardenia (1990)
Caribe (1990)
El Desprecio (1991)
Eva Marina (1992)
Kassandra (1992–1993)
Por Estas Calles (1992–1994)
Dulce Ilusión (1993)
De Oro Puro (1993–1994)
Pura Sangre (1994)
Entrega Total (1995)
Amores de Fin de Siglo (1995)
El Desafío (1995)
Ilusiones (1995)
La Inolvidable (1996)
Volver a Vivir (1996)
Los Amores de Anita Peña (1996)
Maria de los Angeles (1997)
Niña mimada (1998)
Cambio de Piel (1997–1998)
Aunque me Cueste la Vida (1998)
Reina de Corazones (1998)
Hoy te Vi (1998)
Luisa Fernanda (1998–1999)
Mujer Secreta (1999)
Carita Pintada (1999)
Mariú (2000)
Hay Amores Que Matan (2000)
Mis Tres Hermanas (2000)
Angelica Pecado (2000)
Carissima (2001)
Viva la Pepa (2001)
La Niña de mis ojos (2001)
La Mujer de Judas (2001)
La Soberana (2001)
A Calzon Quitao (2001)
Juana la Virgen (2002)
Trapos Íntimos (2002)
Mi Gorda Bella (2002)
La Cuaima (2003)
La Invasora (2003)
¡Qué buena se puso Lola! (2004)
Negra Consentida (2004)
Estrambotica Anastasia (2004)
Mujer con pantalones (2005)
Ser Bonita no Basta (2005)
Amantes (telenovela) (2005)
Amor a Palos (2005)
Por todo lo alto (2006)
El Desprecio (2006)
Yo Los Declaro Marido y Mujer (2006–2007)
Te Tengo en Salsa (2006–2007)
Camaleona (2007)
Mi Prima Ciela (2007)
Toda Una Dama (2007–2008)
La trepadora (2008)
Nadie me diga como quererte (2008–2009)
Calle luna, Calle sol (2009)
Libres como el viento  (2009)
Que el cielo me explique (2010)
La hija del panadero (2010)
 La Dama De Rosa (2010)

Reality
Justicia Para Todos (1999–2000)
Súper Diente por Diente (2000–2006)
Fama y Aplausos/Fama Sudor y Lagrimas (2001–present)
El Resuelve (2002–2006)
Casting RCTV (2004)
Date con Todo (2006)
Duelo de Famosos (2006)
Montados en la Olla (2008–present)

Variety
Valores Humanos (1953–1967)
El Show de las Doce (1954–1964)
Week-End con las Estrellas (195?-19??)
Debutantes Phillips (195?-19??)
Lo de Hoy (1954–1983)
El Show de Renny (1958–1959; 1961–1962; 1964–1965; 1967–1971)
El Show de Joselo (1964-1972; 1981)
Renny presenta... (1965–1970)
Sabado Espectacular (1968–1970)
Popy (1973–1986)
Sopotocientos (1972–1974)
Estudio 30 (1983–1984)
Fantástico
Cállate con Carlos Sicilia (1989–2000)
900 Risas (1991–2001)
Supercrópolis (1992-1994)
Hay que Oír a los Niños (1993–1999)
Gente de la Mañana (199?-199?)
La Casa de las Sorpresas (1998–1999)
Atrevete a Soñar (1998–2003)
Aló RCTV (1999)
A Gozar (1995–2001)
Emilio Punto Combo (2000-2001-2009)

Game show
Concurso Millonario (19??-198?)
Aprieta y Gana (2000–2002)
Avízzzpate (200?-200?)
El Precio Justo (2004)
Arranca (2005–2006)
Al Pie de la Letra (2006–2007)

Documentary
Expedición (1986–1998)
Archivo Criminal (1990-1995; 1999-2002)
Archivos del más Allá (2002-2004)
Pantalla de Plata

Other
Hablan las Cartas (1999–2006)
Mochileros (200?-present)
50 y Palante (2003)

See also
RCTV
List of programs broadcast by RCTV

RCTV